The Kaikōura Peninsula is located in the northeast of New Zealand's South Island. It protrudes  into the Pacific Ocean. The town of Kaikōura is located on the north shore of the peninsula. The peninsula has been settled by Maori for approximately 1000 years, and by Europeans since the 1800s, when whaling operations began off the Kaikōura Coast. Since the end of whaling in 1922 whales have been allowed to thrive and the region is now a popular whale watching destination.

The Kaikōura Peninsula is made up of limestone and mudstone which have been deposited, uplifted and deformed throughout the Quaternary. The peninsula is situated in a tectonically active region bounded by the Marlborough Fault System.

History

Maori oral history and tradition describes the demi-god ancestor Māui standing on Kaikōura Peninsula where he "fished up" or discovered the North Island.  An old name for the South Island is Te Waka a Māui (the canoe of Maui), and the name of the North Island is Te Ika a Māui (the fish of Māui). The peninsula has been inhabited by Māori for the best part of 1000 years. They used it as a base for hunting moa, and also harvested the plentiful crayfish which are found along the shore. Strategic positions on the high terraces were fortified and those fortifications can still be seen in lidar imagery of the peninsula

During the 19th century, European whaling stations were established in the area. In more recent times, the whales that visit the coast off the peninsula have been allowed to thrive, and whale-watching makes the area a popular ecotourism destination. Whales frequent these coastal waters because squid and other deep-sea creatures are brought from the deep Hikurangi Trench to the surface by the combination currents and steeply sloping seafloor.

Geology and geomorphology 

The Kaikōura Peninsula is located on the east coast of the South Island of New Zealand. Geologically the peninsula consists of an asymmetrical anticline bounded on either side by two synclines, the axis of which strikes northeast–southwest. The peninsula is made up of two different types of sedimentary rocks, the Amuri Limestone of Palaeocene age and Oligocene aged mudstone. Intense folding and minor faulting have occurred, particularly in the limestone area. Shore platforms are developed in both lithological units, those in limestone displaying wider variability in morphology. The multi-level terraces were once wave-cut platforms, created at sea level and uplifted out of the sea by tectonic processes, at which point the next step would be cut. In the landscape they appear as a flight of terraces with the oldest appearing at the top and the youngest at the shoreline where the Kaikoura township is situated.

The shoreline of the Kaikōura Peninsula is exposed to an extremely long fetch from the Pacific Ocean, and it is also characterised as a high-energy oceanic swell environment, with high-energy storms interrupting long periods of relative calm. High-energy storms due to the passage of cyclonic depressions over New Zealand can occur at any time of the year. The Kaikoura Coast has a mean tidal range of 1.36 m and a maximum of 2.57 m. The region has a temperate climate with moderate rainfall, averaging 865 mm per year and mean monthly temperatures range from 7.7° Celsius in July to 16.2° Celsius in January.

The Kaikōura Peninsula environment is subject to highly energetic processes in terms of both marine and weathering processes. Shore platforms are exposed to the dominant wave directions and are in the intertidal zone. Consequently, both marine erosive forces and subaerial weathering processes contribute to erosion. Shore platforms range from 40 m to over 200 m wide and are cut in Tertiary mudstones and limestones.

Tectonic uplift of the central parts of the peninsula is estimated to be in the order of 100 metres during the Quaternary but the terraces are tilting and so surface uplift is variable. Flights of beaches that fringe the Peninsula record a combination of uplift by earthquakes and sea level fall. The most recent uplift occurred during the Kaikōura Earthquake of 14 November 2016 and another probably occurred shortly before the arrival of whalers in the area around 1840. The shore platforms are polycyclic and contain inherent morphological features but are being actively rejuvenated by the removal of cover deposits.

Four main phases of tectonic activity are identified for the last 5–6000 years. These involve changing tectonic-eustatic levels, platform processes and erosional episodes in the hinterland. Consequently, the platforms are rapidly evolving features which reflect both contemporary processes and recent tectonic history.

References

Kaikōura
Kaikōura District
Peninsulas of New Zealand
Headlands of Canterbury, New Zealand